In Greek mythology, Polyxenus or Polyxeinus  (Poluxenos, or , Poluxeinos) is a name that may refer to:

Polyxenus, one of the first priests of Demeter and one of the first to learn the secrets of the Eleusinian Mysteries.
Polyxenus, son of Agasthenes and Peloris, king of Elis. He was counted among the suitors of Helen, and accordingly participated in the Trojan War, having brought 40 ships with him. He returned home safely after the war, and had a son Amphimachus, whom he possibly named after his friend Amphimachus (son of Cteatus), who had died at Troy. Polyxenus, king of Elis, was said to have been entrusted with the stolen cattle by the Taphians under Pterelaus; the cattle was ransomed from him by Amphitryon. This Polyxenus, however, appears to be a figure distinct from Polyxenus, son of Agasthenes, since he lived two generations before the Trojan War.
Polyxenus, also called Medus, son of the hero Jason and the Colchian sorceress Medea, the daughter of King Aeëtes. He was the brother of Eriopis.

Notes

References 

 Apollodorus, The Library with an English Translation by Sir James George Frazer, F.B.A., F.R.S. in 2 Volumes, Cambridge, MA, Harvard University Press; London, William Heinemann Ltd. 1921. ISBN 0-674-99135-4. Online version at the Perseus Digital Library. Greek text available from the same website.
 Dares Phrygius, from The Trojan War. The Chronicles of Dictys of Crete and Dares the Phrygian translated by Richard McIlwaine Frazer, Jr. (1931-). Indiana University Press. 1966. Online version at theoi.com
 Dictys Cretensis, from The Trojan War. The Chronicles of Dictys of Crete and Dares the Phrygian translated by Richard McIlwaine Frazer, Jr. (1931-). Indiana University Press. 1966. Online version at the Topos Text Project.
 Gaius Julius Hyginus, Fabulae from The Myths of Hyginus translated and edited by Mary Grant. University of Kansas Publications in Humanistic Studies. Online version at the Topos Text Project.
 Homer, The Iliad with an English Translation by A.T. Murray, Ph.D. in two volumes. Cambridge, MA., Harvard University Press; London, William Heinemann, Ltd. 1924. . Online version at the Perseus Digital Library.
 Homer, Homeri Opera in five volumes. Oxford, Oxford University Press. 1920. . Greek text available at the Perseus Digital Library.
 The Homeric Hymns and Homerica with an English Translation by Hugh G. Evelyn-White. Homeric Hymns. Cambridge, MA.,Harvard University Press; London, William Heinemann Ltd. 1914. Online version at the Perseus Digital Library. Greek text available from the same website.
 Pausanias, Description of Greece with an English Translation by W.H.S. Jones, Litt.D., and H.A. Ormerod, M.A., in 4 Volumes. Cambridge, MA, Harvard University Press; London, William Heinemann Ltd. 1918. . Online version at the Perseus Digital Library
 Pausanias, Graeciae Descriptio. 3 vols. Leipzig, Teubner. 1903.  Greek text available at the Perseus Digital Library.

Achaean Leaders
Ancient Greek priests
Kings of Elis
Kings in Greek mythology
Corinthian characters in Greek mythology
Elean characters in Greek mythology
Eleusinian characters in Greek mythology
Children of Medea
Children of Jason